Miramichi Bay is a settlement in Northumberland County, New Brunswick.

Miramichi Bay and River  Origin unknown; possibly from the Montagnais Maissimeau Assi, "the land of the Micmacs".  Ganong suggests that it may well be a "greatly altered European form", since the word Micmac itself is of possible French origin.  Miramichy  applied to the river by Nicolas Denys in 1672.

History

Notable people

See also
List of communities in New Brunswick

References

Settlements in New Brunswick
Communities in Northumberland County, New Brunswick